Haralson may refer to:
 Haralson, Georgia
 Haralson County, Georgia
 Haralson (apple), variety of apple
 Haralson (surname)